Harqin Banner (Mongolian:   Qaračin qosiɣu) is a banner of southeastern Inner Mongolia, People's Republic of China.

Climate

See also
Wangyefu

References

External Links
www.xzqh.org 

Banners of Inner Mongolia
Chifeng